"Square One" is a song by American musician Tom Petty and is the second track on his 2006 album, Highway Companion. The song was originally released in September 2005 as part of the soundtrack for the film Elizabethtown. In December 2005, it was nominated for Grammy Award for Best Song Written for a Motion Picture, Television or Other Visual Media in the Grammy Awards of 2006.

References

2005 songs
Tom Petty songs
Song recordings produced by Jeff Lynne
Songs written by Tom Petty